Klementjevs is a surname. Notable people with the surname include:

 Andrejs Klementjevs (born 1973), Latvian politician
 Efims Klementjevs (born 1963), Latvian canoer
 Ivans Klementjevs (born 1960), Latvian politician and canoer